This is a complete list of ice hockey players who played for the Philadelphia Phantoms of the American Hockey League (AHL). It includes players that played at least one match, either in the AHL regular season or in the AHL playoffs. Comcast Spectacor purchased an AHL expansion franchise in December 1995 to play in the Spectrum and from the 1996–97 season to the 2008–09 season, the Phantoms saw 24 goaltenders and 234 skaters wear its jersey. The Phantoms won the Calder Cup in 1998 and 2005 with a total of 46 players. Only goaltender Neil Little was a member of both Calder Cup winning rosters while John Stevens was the captain of the 1998 team and the head coach of the 2005 team.

Key
 Won a Calder Cup with the Phantoms

Goaltenders

Goaltenders who played for the team

Skaters

Skaters who played for the team

See also
List of Adirondack Phantoms players
List of Lehigh Valley Phantoms players

Notes

 Beginning in the 2004–05 season, ties are no longer possible.
  The nationality column lists the player's national team or country of birth if the player has never competed internationally. The player's national team is listed if it differs from their country of birth. For example, Richard Park was born in South Korea but played for the United States internationally. His nationality is listed as United States.
 The seasons column lists the first year of the season of the player's first game and the last year of the season of the player's last game. For example, a player who played one game in the 1999–2000 season would be listed as playing with the team from 1999 to 2000, regardless of what calendar year the game occurred within.''

References

General

Specific

Philadelphia Phantoms
Philadelphia Phantoms
 
Philadelphia Phantoms players
Philadelphia Phantoms players